Denmark is a Scandinavian country in Europe. The country has a developed mixed economy that is classed as a high-income economy by the World Bank. It ranks 18th in the world in terms of GDP (PPP) per capita and 6th in nominal GDP per capita. Denmark's economy stands out as one of the most free in the Index of Economic Freedom and the Economic Freedom of the World. It is the 13th most competitive economy in the world, and 8th in Europe, according to the World Economic Forum in its Global Competitiveness Report 2014–2015.

For further information on the types of business entities in this country and their abbreviations, see "Business entities in Denmark".

Largest firms 

This list shows firms in the Fortune Global 500, which ranks firms by total revenues reported before March 31, 2017. Only the top five firms (if available) are included as a sample.

Notable firms 
This list includes notable companies with primary headquarters located in the country. The industry and sector follow the Industry Classification Benchmark taxonomy. Organizations which have ceased operations are included and noted as defunct.

See also 
 Economy of Denmark

References

External links 
 Companies in Denmark

 
Denmark